There Goes the Bride may refer to:

 There Goes the Bride (1932 film)
 There Goes the Bride (1980 film)
 The Wedding March
 There Goes the Bride (play) 1975 stage play by Ray Cooney and John Chapman